Burnett Bay is a Canadian Arctic waterway in the Northwest Territories.  It is an eastern arm of the Arctic Ocean's Beaufort Sea on northwestern Banks Island.  Robillard Island, Norway Island, and Bernard Island lie in a semicircle outside the bay's mouth. The bay was named for William Burnett, Director-General of the Medical Department of the Navy, by Robert McClure during the McClure Arctic Expedition.

References

Bays of the Northwest Territories
Bays of the Arctic Ocean